A savings account is a bank account at a retail bank. Common features include a limited number of withdrawals, a lack of cheque and linked debit card facilities, limited transfer options and the inability to be overdrawn. Traditionally, transactions on savings accounts were widely recorded in a passbook, and were sometimes called passbook savings accounts, and bank statements were not provided; however, currently such transactions are commonly recorded electronically and accessible online.

People deposit funds in savings account for a variety of reasons, including a safe place to hold their cash. Savings accounts normally pay interest as well: almost all of them accrue compound interest over time. Several countries require savings accounts to be protected by deposit insurance and some countries provide a government guarantee for at least a portion of the account balance.

There are many types of savings accounts, often serving particular purposes. These may include accounts for young savers, accounts for retirees, Christmas club accounts, investment accounts, and money market accounts. Some savings accounts also have other special requirements, such as a minimum initial deposit, deposits made regularly, and notices of withdrawal.

Regulations

United States

In the United States, Sec. 204.2(d)(1) of Regulation D (FRB) previously limited withdrawals from savings accounts to six transfers or withdrawals per month, a limitation which was removed in April 2020, though some banks continue to impose a limit voluntarily as of 2021. There is no limit to the number of deposits into the account. Violations of the regulation may result in a service charge or may result in the account being changed to a checking account.

Regulation D sets smaller reserve requirements for savings account balances. In addition, customers can plan withdrawals to avoid fees and earn interest, which contributes to more stable savings account balances on which banks can lend. A savings account linked to a checking account at the same financial institution can help avoid fees due to overdrafts and reduce banking costs.

High yield savings accounts 
High yield savings accounts, sometimes abbreviated to HYSA, are a type of savings account with higher interest than normal savings accounts. These accounts typically earn 10 times more in interest than a normal savings account. HYSAs can be a good option for short-term investing.

India
In India, Savings Bank did not exist at most banks in India. Customers only relied on fixed deposits for their savings. Canara Bank (earlier Canara Banking Corporation Limited) introduced the concept of a Savings Bank account in 1920 with very stringent norms. A customer could deposit minimum Rupee one and maximum Rupees one thousand. He was not allowed to carry a balance beyond Rupees two thousand.And most important the customer could not withdraw his money whenever he wanted to, he had to give three days' notice to the bank to withdraw his money. Banks found innovative ways of adding to their income from Savings Accounts. For every passbook, the customers were asked to pay 25 paise(now given free of cost). Besides banks enjoyed the freedom to fix the interest rate on deposits on the lowest credit balance of any one day of each month. For some time the rate of interest on Savings Account in Indian Banks were regulated by Reserve Bank of India. Now again it is decided by individual Banks in India but they are to follow the Know your customer guidelines introduced in 2002.

The bank deposits in Banks in India is insured by Deposit Insurance and Credit Guarantee Corporation formed by an act called The Deposit Insurance and Credit Guarantee Corporation Act, 1961. The limit of insurance at present is Rupees five lakhs only.

References

External links

Bank account
Interest-bearing instruments